A bow drill is a simple hand-operated type of tool, consisting of a rod (the spindle or drill shaft) that is set in rapid rotary motion by means of a cord wrapped around it, kept taut by a bow which is pushed back and forth with one hand.  This tool of prehistoric origin has been used both as a drill, to make holes on solid materials such as wood, stone, bone, or teeth, and as a fire drill to start a fire.

The spindle can be held in a fixed frame, or by a hand-held block (the hand piece or thimble) with a hole into which the top of the shaft is inserted.  Some lubricant should be used to reduce friction between these two parts.  A popular campcraft book of 1920 attributed this invention to the Inuit. In Mehrgarh (Pakistan) it has been dated between the 4th-5th millennium BCE.

The string of the bow is wrapped once around the spindle, so that it is tight enough not to slip during operation. In the variation called the Egyptian bow drill, the cord is wound around the shaft multiple times, or is fixed to it by a knot or a hole.

The strap drill is a simpler version, where the bow is absent and the cord is kept taut by pulling the ends with both hands, while moving them left and right at the same time.   In the absence of a frame, the thimble is shaped so that it can be held with the chin or mouth.

History
Bow drills with green jasper bits were used in Mehrgarh between the 4th and 5th millennium BC to drill holes into lapis lazuli and carnelian. Similar drills were found in other parts of the Indus Valley civilization and Iran one millennium later.

Usage

For use as a fire drill, the shaft should have a blunt end, which is placed into a small cavity of a stationary piece of wood (the fireboard).  Turning the shaft with high speed and downward pressure generates heat, which eventually creates powdered charcoal and ignites it forming a small ember.

For drilling, the lower end of the spindle may be fitted with a hard drill bit that creates the hole by abrasion or cutting.

See also 
 Drill
 Pump drill
 Brace (tool)

References

External links
 Information on constructing and using a hand drill
 The Egyptian Bow Drill

Mechanical hand tools
Primitive technology
Woodworking hand tools
Firelighting using friction